Gwozdz, Gwóźdź, or Gwosdz is a Polish surname, which means a nail. Notable people with the surname include:

Doug Gwosdz (born 1960), American baseball player
Karol Gwóźdź (born 1987), Upper Silesian poet and musician
Lawrence Gwozdz (born 1953), American classical saxophonist

See also
 

Polish-language surnames